Gregorio López Fuentes (born 17 November 1897-1966) was a Mexican novelist, poet, and journalist. He was one of the leading chroniclers of the Mexican Revolution.

He came in contact with the Indians, farmers, and labourers of the regional lives of America, whose lives he later described in his works.

After unsuccessful efforts at poetry and novels, he began to draw upon his experiences in the Mexican Revolution.

Later on, he became a teacher of literature at a school in Mexico City. In 1921 he began writing for the El Universal often under the Tulio F. Peseenz pseudonym. His stories were seen as exciting, humorous, and symbolic of Mexico. A realist, many of his works concerned the oppression of Native Americans. He was a contemporary of Mariano Azuela and Martín Luis Guzmán.

His first success was Campamento (Encampment) in 1931. This was followed by Tierra (Earth) in 1932, a novel about the Mexican revolutionary Emiliano Zapata and ¡Mi general! (My General!) in 1934, a work on the lives of generals after the Revolution. His most celebrated work is El indio (The Indian), published in 1935, a fictional study of the life of Mexico's indigenous race.

His many other books include La siringa de cristal (1914), Clas de selva (1921), El vagabundo (1922), El alma del poblacho (1924), Arrieros (1937), Huasteca (1939), Una Carta a Dios (A Letter to God) (1940), and many more.

He was awarded the National Prize of Arts and Sciences in 1935.

Legacy
Zontecomatlán de López y Fuentes, municipality in Veracruz

References

External links 
 A letter to God (A short story by GL Fuentes)

Mexican male poets
Mexican journalists
Male journalists
1890s births
2002 deaths
20th-century Mexican poets
20th-century Mexican male writers
People from Veracruz
Place of death missing
20th-century journalists